Richard Loving may refer to:

 Mildred and Richard Loving, plaintiffs in the U.S. Supreme Court case Loving v. Virginia
 Loving v. Virginia, 1967 U.S. Supreme Court case abolishing restrictions on interracial marriage
 Richard Loving (artist) (1924–2021), American painter 

Loving, Richard